Tablada may refer to:

José Juan Tablada (1871–1945), Mexican poet, art critic, and diplomat
La Tablada, a city in Buenos Aires Province, Argentina
Tablada Nueva, a neighbourhood (barrio) of Asunción, Paraguay
Club La Tablada, a multi-sports club from Córdoba, Argentina
Tablada Aerodrome, a former sports and aviation venue in Seville, Spain